A tenotomy is a surgical act which involves the division of a tendon. It and related procedures are also referred to as tendon release, tendon lengthening, and heel-cord release.

When it involves the Achilles tendon, it is called "Achillotenotomy".

It has been used in the treatment of cerebral palsy.

It has also been used for hammer toe.

As an alternative to SLAP lesion labral repair, the tendon of the long head of the bicep can be released.

Achilles tenotomy is commonly used as part of the Ponseti Method of treating clubfoot.

See also 
 List of surgeries by type

References

Surgical procedures and techniques
Soft tissue